Yusuf Şimşek (born July 20, 1975) is a Turkish football manager and former player. He most recently served as the manager of Balıkesirspor.

Club career

Fenerbahçe SK
During his time at Fenerbahçe, his teammate Ariel Ortega once highlighted Yusuf's incredible talent with the ball: "This guy could get past a man even in a phone booth".

Later career and Beşiktaş J.K.
As a player with a background in Denizlispor for 4 seasons, in Fenerbahçe S.K. for 2 seasons and in many other Anatolian squads including Ankaraspor, Bursaspor, Yusuf's transition to Beşiktaş J.K. stirred the football community. It was claimed that Trabzonspor made a proposal for Yusuf long before Beşiktaş did, and further that both Bursaspor and Yusuf himself accepted the formal offer that Trabzonspor made. However, that claim was not verified. Actually, Trabzonspor's offer included a part-exchange deal sending Adnan Güngör to Bursaspor; but the deal went off when Adnan refused to exchange teams. Then after Mustafa Denizli's persistence for an efficient playmaker, Yusuf was transferred to Beşiktaş J.K., for a part-exchange deal including Tuna Üzümcü plus 400k euro.

Following the accusations directed by Fenerbahçe and Trabzonspor supporters, which were mainly centered on "betrayal", Yusuf felt the need to make it public that he had always been a Beşiktaş J.K. fan, displaying a childhood photograph where he could be seen in a striped black&white jersey. He further stated that he was deeply affected by the legendary era between early 80s-mid 90s under the helm of Gordon Milne, which includes successive title achievements.

The transfer was severely criticized in Beşiktaş J.K. community as well, due to exchanging 2 promising youngsters for an aging player. In such a harsh climate, where even Beşiktaş board could not give a solid vote for him, he immediately assumed the role of a playmaker, and became one of the key players carrying the team through the way to 2 most important trophies of Turkish football in 2008/09 season. Although his teammate Matias Delgado did not have any real competition for the attacking midfielder position for 2 years up until then, Yusuf was quick to take up the position from his hands. For the 2008/09 season, he made 27 league apps (10 with Bursaspor, 17 with Beşiktaş) and 6 Fortis Turkish Cup apps (all with Beşiktaş); scoring 5 goals at total (3 league goals/2 cup goals; all for Beşiktaş). He especially scored crucial goals against arch-rivals Galatasaray (in league) and Fenerbahçe (in Türkiye Kupası 2008–09 final) as the finals for both competitions draw near.

Kayseri Erciyesspor
On 18 January 2011, Yusuf signed a two-year contract to the Kayseri Erciyesspor. As of 2016, he was playing for Turgutluspor in the TFF Sportoto 2. Lig.

International career
Despite his vast technical capacity and high ball possession skills, unique shuffles, feints and dribbles, Yusuf was able to attain a fame throughout Turkey in his late 20s. Due to playing his most remarkable games through the ages of 26–33, and with the addition of a playing style that is generally labeled as "selfish", he has been called up to national squad only for 6 times. Mainly because of that reason, this right-sided attacking midfielder has been generally the second pick for Fatih Terim as the former head of National Squad, just like his current coach Mustafa Denizli.

Managerial statistics

References

External links
 TFF Profile 

1975 births
Living people
Association football midfielders
Turkish footballers
Turkey international footballers
Turkey B international footballers
Fenerbahçe S.K. footballers
Bursaspor footballers
Beşiktaş J.K. footballers
Kayseri Erciyesspor footballers
Denizlispor managers
Denizlispor footballers
Sportspeople from Antalya
Süper Lig players
Gaziantepspor footballers
Ankaraspor footballers
Akçaabat Sebatspor footballers
Karşıyaka S.K. managers
Fatih Karagümrük S.K. managers
Turkish football managers